Yasa was a bhikkhu during the time of Gautama Buddha. He was the sixth bhikkhu in the Buddha's sangha and was the sixth to achieve arahanthood. Yasa lived in the 6th century BCE in what is now Uttar Pradesh and Bihar in northern India.

Yasa was raised in Varanasi in a life of luxury. His father was wealthy. The family home was full of servants, musicians and dancers who catered for the family's needs and entertainment. One day, when he had become a young man, Yasa awoke early and saw his female servants and entertainers asleep in a repulsive state. Disgusted by the spectacle, Yasa realised the vanity of worldly life, and left the family home muttering “Distressed am I, oppressed am I” and journeyed in the direction of Isipatana where the Buddha was temporarily residing after his first five bhikkhus had attained arahantship. This was five days after all of the first five bhikkhus had attained arahantship.

The Buddha was pacing up and down in an open space near where Yasa was muttering “Distressed am I, oppressed am I”, and called Yasa over to him, inviting him to sit down. Yasa took off his golden sandals, saluted and sat down. The Buddha gave a dharma discourse, and Yasa achieved the first stage of arahanthood, sotapanna.

At first, the Buddha spoke about generosity (Dana), morality (sila), celestial states (sagga), the evils of sensual pleasure (kamadinava), blessing of renunciation (nekkhammanisamsa), before teaching the Four Noble Truths. 
Yasa's mother had noticed her son's absence, and notified her husband, who sent horsemen in four directions to search for Yasa. Yasa's father headed in the direction of Isipatana, following the trail left by the golden slippers. When the millionaire saw the Buddha and asked him if he had seen Yasa, the Buddha asked him to sit down, and then delivered a dharma talk. After this Yasa's father became the first to take refuge in the Triple Gems, the Buddha, Dharma and Sangha. Yasa, who was in the vicinity and had heard the talk given to his father, became an arahant. After father and son were reunited, the father invited the Buddha and the Sangha to his home for alms on the following day. The Buddha then ordained Yasa.

The Buddha and his six arahants visited the home of Yasa the following day. Yasa's mother and his former wife thus became the first two female lay disciples. Upon hearing of Yasa's ordination, four of his closest friends, Vimala, Subahu, Punnaji and Gavampati followed him into the sangha and they too became arahants. Within two months, a further fifty of Yasa's friends had joined the Sangha and attained arahantship, bringing the total number of arahants to sixty.

References 

Arhats
Disciples of Gautama Buddha